Luko may refer to:

People
 Luko Biskup (born 1981), Croatian football player
 Luko Stulić (1772–1828), Ragusan scientist
 Luko Zore (1846–1906), Serbian philologist

Places
 Luko, Kalinovik, Bosnia and Herzegovina